Lexington Cemetery is a private, non-profit  rural cemetery and arboretum located at 833 W. Main Street, Lexington, Kentucky.
            
The Lexington Cemetery was established in 1848 as a place of beauty and a public cemetery, in part to deal with burials from the cholera epidemic in the area. What became Lexington National Cemetery was established in 1861 to inter American Civil War casualties. It was designed by Charles S. Bell and John Lutz.  It was originally 40 acres but has expanded to 170 acres with more than 64,000 interments.

Its plantings include boxwood, cherries, crabapples, dogwoods, magnolias, taxus, as well as flowers such as begonias, chrysanthemums, irises, jonquils, lantanas, lilies, and tulips. Also on the grounds is an American basswood (Tilia Americana), which the cemetery claims to be the largest in the world. However, this claim is not supported by the National Register of Big Trees, which claims that the largest American Basswood is located in Montgomery County, Pennsylvania.

Monuments 
Two Confederate monuments were originally built in the cemetery, Confederate Soldier Monument in Lexington Ladies' Confederate Memorial (1874) and Confederate Soldier Monument in Lexington (1893). In 2018, two additional Confederate monuments were relocated here from downtown Lexington: John C. Breckinridge Memorial and John Hunt Morgan Memorial. All four monuments are individually listed on the National Register of Historic Places.

Some notable people 
The Lexington Cemetery maintains a list of notable interments, others are listed here:

A 
 George Madison Adams (1837–1920) – Civil War veteran, U.S. Congressman
 James Lane Allen (1849–1925) –  author

B 
 Milton K. Barlow (1818–1891) –  planetarium inventor
 Frances Estill Beauchamp (1860–1923) – temperance activist, social reformer, lecturer
 James Burnie Beck (1822–1890) – Senator
 Charles Henry Berryman (1867–1946) – Gen Mgr for James Ben Ali Haggin's Elmendorf Farm 1904–1914, Lexington Postmaster 1915–1917, President/part owner of the Phoenix Hotel (Lexington, Kentucky) 1920
 Clifton R. Breckinridge (1846–1932) –  John Cabell Breckinridge's son
 John Cabell Breckinridge (1821–1875) – U.S. Vice President, Civil War Confederate Major General
 Gay Brewer (1932–2007) – golfer
 Charles Jacob Bronston (1848–1909) – Commonwealth's Atty 10th Jud'l. Dist. 1879–1895, Senator Kentucky Senate 1896–1900, respected local attorney
 Charles Jacob Bronston, Jr (1882–1961) – Democrat. Kentucky House of Representatives 76th District 1940–1941 and 49th District 1948–1951
 John Y. Brown Jr. (1933–2022) – Governor of Kentucky, 1979–1983, one-time owner of Kentucky Fried Chicken (KFC), Boston Celtics and other business ventures.
 Sanders Dewees Bruce (1825–1902) – Civil War Union Army general
 Aylette Buckner (1806–1869) – U.S. Congressman
 Joseph Henry Bush (1794–1865) – portraitist
 Abraham Buford (1820–1884) – Civil War Confederate Army officer, turfman

C 
 Henry Clay (1777–1852) – antebellum Speaker of the House, three-time U.S. Presidential candidate, architect of the Missouri Compromise
 James Brown Clay (1817–1864) – U.S. Congressman
 Laura Clay (1849–1941) – Suffragist
 Mary Barr Clay (1839–1924) – Women's Suffrage movement leader
 John Winston Coleman Jr. (1898–1983) – historian, author
 Leslie Combs (1793–1881) – War of 1812 veteran, general
 Robert Wickliffe Cooper (1831–1867) – Union Army officer – Civil War. Post-war service as 2nd Major of the 7th Cavalry (Gen. Geo. A. Custer). Died ignominiously before Little Big Horn.
 Jesse Orin Creech (1895–1948) – World War I Fighter Ace
 Rev Spencer Cooper,  Trustee of Translyvania University 1829. Tended the sick in the cholera epidemic of 1833, became ill and never fully recovered. Minister of the Methodist Episcopal Church in Lexington. Owner of a Powder House (made gunpowder).

D 
 Mary Desha,  (1850–1911), one of the four founders of Daughters of the American Revolution.
 Herman Lee Donovan, (1887–1964), fourth president of the University of Kentucky
 Benjamin Winslow Dudley (1785–1870), Gifted surgeon. Appointed chair of surgery and anatomy at Transylvania University 1809 and again in 1818. Pioneered surgical procedures, including removal of stones (lithotomy) and cranial surgery for epilepsy.
 Ethelbert Ludlow Dudley, Medical doctor and Civil War Colonel
 Basil Wilson Duke (1838–1916) –  Civil War General 
 George B. Duncan (1861–1950) – United States Army general in World War I
 Henry Clay Dunlap (1828–1872) – Civil War Union brevet brigadier general

E 
 Andrew Eugene Erwin (1830–1863) – Civil War Confederate Army officer

F 
 Joseph S. Fowler (1820–1902) – Senator
 Ralph Wesley Foody (1928–1999) – character actor.

G 
 John R. Gaines (1928–2005) – thoroughbred pioneer, philanthropist
 John M. Gaver, Sr. (1900–1982) – U.S. Hall of Fame racehorse trainer
 Phyllis George (1949–2020) – Miss America 1971, sportscaster, First Lady of Kentucky (1979–1983)
 Randall L. Gibson (1832–1892) – Senator, Civil War Confederate Army brevet brigadier general
 Thomas Boston Gordon (1816–1891) – a founder of Beta Theta Pi fraternity
 Gordon Granger (1822–1876) – Civil War Union Major general

H 
 Henry Hampton Halley (1874–1965) – author of the Halley's Bible
 Roger Hanson (1827–1863) – Civil War Confederate brevet brigadier general
 Hal Price Headley (1888–1962) – racehorse owner/breeder. A founder of Keeneland Racecourse. National Museum of Racing and Hall of Fame
 Thomas H. Hunt (1815–1884) – Civil War Confederate Army officer
 Thomas Hughes (1789–1862) Owned the farm later called Elmendorf Farm from 1855 to 1862. When he bought it from Carter Harrison, Sr it was called Clifton.
 William Thomas Hughes  (1832–1874) WT, son of Thomas, inherited the farm  later called Elmendorf Farm in 1862. He began to buy land at high interest rates, and to build up the cattle herd. He was murdered by his uncle for defaulting on a loan.
 Sarah Gibson Humphreys (1830–1907), author, suffragist

J 
 John Telemachus Johnson (1788–1856) – U.S. Congressman
 William Augustus Jones, Jr. (1934–2006) – minister and civil rights leader

K 
 William P. Kimball (1857–1926) – U.S. Congressman

L 
 Thomas Lewinski, architect

M 
 Gene Markey (1895–1980) – Hollywood screenwriter and producer and highly decorated U.S. Naval officer – veteran of World War I and World War II
 Lucille P. Markey (1896–1982) – owner, Calumet Farm, wife of Gene Markey
 Alexander Marshall (1808–1884) – U.S. Congressman
 Thomas Alexander Marshall (1794–1871) – U.S. Congressman
 Henry Brainerd McClellan (1840–1904) – Civil War Confederate Army officer, author, educator
 Byron McClelland (1855–1897), renowned Thoroughbred racehorse owner/breeder
 Hugh McKee (1844–1871) – Naval officer
 John McMurtry (1812–1890), builder and architect
 John Hunt Morgan (1825–1864) – Civil War Confederate general

O 
 Howard W. Oots (1876–1955), Thoroughbred racehorse trainer, owner, breeder

P 
 Katherine Pettit (1868–1936) – Cofounder of Hindman Settlement School with May Stone and the Pine Mountain Settlement School with Ethel de Long Zande
 Rev. Dr. Charles Lynn Pyatt, Dean of the College of the Bible

R 
 James Reilly (1811–1863) – politician
 George Robertson (1790–1874) – U.S. Congressman
 Arthur B. Rouse (1874–1956) – U.S. Congressman
 Adolph Rupp (1901–1977) – Hall of Fame basketball coach

S 
 George S. Shanklin (1807–1883) – U.S. Congressman
 Jouett Shouse (1879–1968) – U.S. Congressman
 Cincinnatus Shryock (1816–1888) – architect
  William "King" Solomon, (1775–1854) –  Town Drunk, Town hero – The Cholera Epidemic of 1833 killed 500 townspeople in 2 months ... King Solomon stayed in Lexington to dig graves, earning the lasting respect of the town.
 May Stone (1867–1946) – Cofounder of Hindman Settlement School with Katherine Pettit
 King Swope (1893–1961) – U.S. Congressman

T 
 Barak G. Thomas (1826–1906), Thoroughbred racehorse breeder
 Eliza Parker Todd – Wife of Robert Smith Todd and Mother of Mary Todd Lincoln
 Levi Todd (1756–1807), One of Lexington's founders and grandfather of Mary Todd Lincoln
 Lyman Beecher Todd, MD  (18? – 1901) First cousin of Mary Todd Lincoln. Close friend of Lincoln. One of the doctors who helped treat the President the night of the assassination.
 Robert Smith Todd (1791–1849) Father of Mary Todd Lincoln, Son of Levi Todd
 William Henry Townsend (1890–1964) – historian and author

U–V 
 Thomas R. Underwood (1898–1956) – U.S. Congressman, Senator
 Solomon Van Meter, Sr. (1818–1859) Farmer and importer of shorthorn cattle, Duncastle Farm
 Solomon Lee Van Meter (1859–1928) Member of Kentucky State Legislature elected 1899, Farmer. Son of Solomon Van Meter. Owner of Shenandoah Hall on the Bryan Station Pike.
 Solomon Lee Van Meter, Jr. (1888–1937) inventor of the Ripcord Backpack Parachute son of Solomon Lee Van Meter.
 2nd Lt Solomon Lee Van Meter, III (1925–1953) Pilot died in Korean War, son of S.L. Van Meter, Jr.
 James Albert Varney, Sr. (1910–1985) – Jim Varney's father
 Jim Varney (1949–2000) –  actor who was best known as Ernest P. Worrell
 Louise H. Varney (1913–1994) – Jim Varney's mother

W 
 Elisha Warfield (1781–1859), physician, academic, Thoroughbred racehorse breeder
 Ethelbert Dudley Warfield (1861–1936), college president
 Howard J. Wells (1903–1955), Thoroughbred racehorse trainer, owner, breeder
 Daniel Carmichal "DC" Wickcliffe (1810–1870)  Whig/Democrat, Secretary of State of Kentucky 1862–63, Newspaper owner and editor "Lexington Observer & Reporter" 1838–1865
 Katharine E. Wilkie (1904–1980) – author
 Elisha I. Winter (1781–1849) – U.S. Congressman
 Rev. Louisa Mariah Layman Woosley (1862–1952) – first woman ordained in the Presbyterian and Reformed tradition in 1889 by the Cumberland Presbyterian Church.

See also 
 List of botanical gardens in the United States

References

External links

 Lexington Cemetery
 

Arboreta in Kentucky
Botanical gardens in Kentucky
Cemeteries on the National Register of Historic Places in Kentucky
National Register of Historic Places in Lexington, Kentucky
Tourist attractions in Lexington, Kentucky
Protected areas of Fayette County, Kentucky
1849 establishments in Kentucky
Rural cemeteries